Lurs (or Lors) are an Iranian people living mainly in western and southwestern Iran. There is also a significant population of Lurs in eastern and central parts of Iraq The word Luristan or Lorestan, is attributed to the areas inhabited by the Lurs. The boundaries of Luristan stretch from the eastern Iraqi plains to the west and southwest of Iran. Today, Lorestan is the name of one of the western provinces of Iran.

Origin 
There are several disputes over the origin of the Lurs and they are believed to be from the Elamite and Kassite origin or a Median or Persian tribe of Aryan origin.

Name 
The first sighting of the word Lur is in the writings of some historians and geographers of the 10th century and later in the form of اللور, اللر and لور (Lur). Hamdallah Mustawfi in Tarikh-e gozida (1330 AD) referred to the settlement of Luri tribes in Levant and then their mass migration towards the current Luri-inhabited areas. There are several hypotheses that discuss the origin of the name Lur or Lor, prominent amongst them is its attribution to a person called Lur or Lohraseb and some believe that the name refers to the area of first settlement of this ethnic group. The word Ler or Lir (literally forest or forest mountain) is a probable source for this word.

Early History

Elam 
The first people who ruled areas of Luristan were Elamites. The extent of the influence of the Elamites has been to the present Mamassani area. They were indigenous peoples of Iran, but there is no proper knowledge of how communities are formed and the beginning of their history. They were able to establish a state before the arrival of Aryan ethnic groups in parts of western Iran. The Elam government included Khuzestan, modern Luristan, Poshtkuh (Ilam province and some western Iraqi areas), Bakhtiari mountains and Southern Luri settlement. Babylonians called the land of Elamites Elam or Elamto, meaning "the mountain" and perhaps "the land of sunrise". Elamite is generally accepted to be a language isolate and thus unrelated to the much later-arriving Persian and Iranic languages. In relation to geographical and archaeological matching, historians argue that the Elamites to be the Proto-Lurs, whose language became Iranian only in the Middle Ages.

Achaemenids to Sassanids 
During the rule of Achaemenid, Luristan was part of the rule of the Kassites and when the Achaemenids moved from Babylon to Hamadan, they had to cross the Luristan area and pay ransom to the Kassites. Pahle was the name of a vast land in west of Iran which was included many cities and areas in the current Zagros. The province of Pahla was named after the Sasanian times and the word Pahlavi refers to the people, the language, and the alphabet related to this region. At the time of the Achaemenids, the current Luristan, along with Ilam and Khuzestan, were the third state of this great empire. During the Parthian period, this land was one of the Satraps (states) of this dynasty and finally, during the Sassanid period, the area was named "Pahla".

References

Lur people
History of ethnic groups in Iran